Hemichordata  is a phylum which consists of triploblastic, enterocoelomate, and bilaterally symmetrical marine deuterostome animals, generally considered the sister group of the echinoderms. They appear in the Lower or Middle Cambrian and include two main classes: Enteropneusta (acorn worms), and Pterobranchia. A third class, Planctosphaeroidea, is known only from the larva of a single species, Planctosphaera pelagica. The class Graptolithina, formerly considered extinct, is now placed within the pterobranchs, represented by a single living genus Rhabdopleura.

Acorn worms are solitary worm-shaped organisms. They generally live in burrows (the earliest secreted tubes) and are deposit feeders, but some species are pharyngeal filter feeders, while the family Torquaratoridae are free living detritivores. Many are well known for their production and accumulation of various halogenated phenols and pyrroles. Pterobranchs are filter-feeders, mostly colonial, living in a collagenous tubular structure called a coenecium.

Anatomy 
The body plan of hemichordates is characterized by a muscular organization. The anteroposterior axis is divided into three parts: the anterior prosome, the intermediate mesosome, and the posterior metasome.

The body of acorn worms is worm-shaped and divided into an anterior proboscis, an intermediate collar, and a posterior trunk. The proboscis is a muscular and ciliated organ used in locomotion and in the collection and transport of food particles. The mouth is located between the proboscis and the collar. The trunk is the longest part of the animal. It contains the pharynx, which is perforated with gill slits (or pharyngeal slits), the oesophagus, a long intestine, and a terminal anus. It also contains the gonads. A post-anal tail is present in juvenile member of the acorn worm family Harrimaniidae.

The prosome of pterobranchs is specialized into a muscular and ciliated cephalic shield used in locomotion and in secreting the coenecium. The mesosome extends into one pair (in the genus Rhabdopleura) or several pairs (in the genus Cephalodiscus) of tentaculated arms used in filter feeding. The metasome, or trunk, contains a looped digestive tract, gonads, and extends into a contractile stalk that connects individuals to the other members of the colony, produced by asexual budding. In the genus Cephalodiscus, asexually produced individuals stay attached to the contractile stalk of the parent individual until completing their development. In the genus Rhabdopleura, zooids are permanently connected to the rest of the colony via a common stolon system.

They have a diverticulum of the foregut called a stomochord, previously thought to be related to the chordate notochord, but this is most likely the result of convergent evolution rather than a homology. A hollow neural tube exists among some species (at least in early life), probably a primitive trait that they share with the common ancestor of chordata and the rest of the deuterostomes. Hemichordates have a nerve net and longitudinal nerves, but no brain.

Some species biomineralize in calcium carbonate.

Circulatory system

Circulatory system is open type. Heart of Hemichordates is dorsal.

Development 
Together with the Echinoderms, the hemichordates form the Ambulacraria, which are the closest extant phylogenetic relatives of chordates. Thus these marine worms are of great interest for the study of the origins of chordate development. There are several species of hemichordates, with a moderate diversity of embryological development among these species. Hemichordates are classically known to develop in two ways, both directly and indirectly. Hemichordates are a phylum composed of two classes, the enteropneusts and the pterobranchs, both being forms of marine worm.

The enteropneusts have two developmental strategies: direct and indirect development. The indirect developmental strategy includes an extended pelagic plankotrophic tornaria larval stage, which means that this hemichordate exists in a larval stage that feeds on plankton before turning into an adult worm. The Pterobranch genus most extensively studied is Rhabdopleura from Plymouth, England and from Bermuda.

The following details the development of two popularly studied species of the hemichordata phylum Saccoglossus kowalevskii and Ptychodera flava. Saccoglossus kowalevskii is a direct developer and Ptychodera flava is an indirect developer. Most of what has been detailed in Hemichordate development has come from hemichordates that develop directly.

Ptychodera flava 
P. flava’s early cleavage pattern is similar to that of S. kowalevskii. The first and second cleavages from the single cell zygote of P. flava are equal cleavages, are orthogonal to each other and both include the animal and vegetal poles of the embryo. The third cleavage is equal and equatorial so that the embryo has four blastomeres both in the vegetal and the animal pole. The fourth division occurs mainly in blastomeres in the animal pole, which divide transversally as well as equally to make eight blastomeres. The four vegetal blastomeres divide equatorially but unequally and they give rise to four big macromeres and four smaller micromeres. Once this fourth division has occurred, the embryo has reached a 16 cell stage. P. flava has a 16 cell embryo with four vegetal micromeres, eight animal mesomeres and 4 larger macromeres. Further divisions occur until P. flava finishes the blastula stage and goes on to gastrulation. The animal mesomeres of P. flava go on to give rise to the larva’s ectoderm, animal blastomeres also appear to give rise to these structures though the exact contribution varies from embryo to embryo. The macromeres give rise to the posterior larval ectoderm and the vegetal micromeres give rise to the internal endomesodermal tissues. Studies done on the potential of the embryo at different stages have shown that at both the two and four cell stage of development P. flava blastomeres can go on to give rise to a tornaria larvae, so fates of these embryonic cells don’t seem to be established till after this stage.

Saccoglossus kowalevskii 
Eggs of S. kowalevskii are oval in shape and become spherical in shape after fertilization. The first cleavage occurs from the animal to the vegetal pole and usually is equal though very often can also be unequal. The second cleavage to reach the embryos four cell stage also occurs from the animal to the vegetal pole in an approximately equal fashion though like the first cleavage it’s possible to have an unequal division. The eight cell stage cleavage is latitudinal; so that each cell from the four cell stage goes on to make two cells. The fourth division occurs first in the cells of the animal pole, which end up making eight blastomeres (mesomeres) that are not radially symmetric, then the four vegetal pole blastomeres divide to make a level of four large blastomeres (macromeres) and four very small blastomeres (micromeres). The fifth cleavage occurs first in the animal cells and then in the vegetal cells to give a 32 cell blastomere. The sixth cleavage occurs in a similar order and completes a 64 cell stage, finally the seventh cleavage marks the end of the cleavage stage with a blastula with 128 blastomeres. This structure goes on to go through gastrulation movements which will determine the body plan of the resulting gill slit larva, this larva will ultimately give rise to the marine acorn worm.

Genetic control of dorsal-ventral hemichordate patterning 
Much of the genetic work done on hemichordates has been done to make comparison with chordates, so many of the genetic markers identified in this group are also found in chordates or are homologous to chordates in some way. Studies of this nature have been done particularly on S. kowalevskii, and like chordates S. kowalevskii has dorsalizing bmp-like factors such as bmp 2/4, which is homologous to Drosophila’s decapentaplegic dpp. The expression of bmp2/4 begins at the onset of gastrulation on the ectodermal side of the embryo, and as gastrulation progresses its expression is narrowed down to the dorsal midline but is not expressed in the post anal tail. The bmp antagonist chordin is also expressed in the endoderm of gastrulating S. kowalevskii. Besides these well known dorsalizing factors, further molecules known to be involved in dorsal ventral patterning are also present in S. kowalevskii, such as a netrin that groups with netrin gene class 1 and 2. Netrin is important in patterning of the neural system in chordates, as well as is the molecule Shh, but S. kowalevskii was only found to have one hh gene and it appears to be expressed in a region that is uncommon to where it is usually expressed in developing chordates along the ventral midline.

Classification 

Hemichordata are divided into two classes: the Enteropneusta, commonly called acorn worms, and the Pterobranchia, which includes the graptolites. A third class, Planctosphaeroidea, is proposed based on a single species known only from larvae. The phylum contains about 120 living species. Hemichordata appears to be sister to the Echinodermata as Ambulacraria; Xenoturbellida may be basal to that grouping. Pterobranchia may be derived from within Enteropneusta, making Enteropneusta paraphyletic. It is possible that the extinct organism Etacystis is a member of the Hemichordata, either within or with close affinity to the Pterobranchia.

There are 130 described species of Hemichordata and many new species are being discovered, especially in the deep sea.

Phylogeny
A phylogenetic tree showing the position of the hemichordates is:

The internal relationships within the hemichordates are shown below. The tree is based on 16S +18S rRNA sequence data and phylogenomic studies from multiple sources.

References

Other references

External links 

 Cameron, C. B. Evolution and classification of Hemichordata
 Dr. Billie J. Swalla on the WEB "Development and Evolution of Hemichordates"
 Dr. Ken Halanych "Phylogeny and Evolution of Hemichordates"
 Dr. Chris Lowe "Genomics and Development of Saccoglossus kowalevskii"
 At the Tree of Life

 
Miaolingian first appearances
Extant Cambrian first appearances
Taxa named by William Bateson